This is a list of hotels that have 3,000 or more guest accommodation rooms. Since 2020, the largest hotel in the world is the First World Hotel in Malaysia with 7,351 rooms divided between two buildings. The largest single hotel building is MGM Grand Las Vegas, with 5,124 rooms in one building.

Largest hotels in the world

See also

 List of largest hotels in Europe
 List of tallest hotels
 Lists of hotels
 List of motels

Notes

References

Largest
Hotels
Hotels